Robatak or Rabatak (Persian/Pashto: رباطک) is a village in Baghlan Province in northeastern Afghanistan.

See also
Baghlan Province
Rabatak inscription

References

External links 
Satellite map at Maplandia.com 

Populated places in Baghlan Province